The Tomb of Emperor Dục Đức, officially the An Mausoleum is a tomb complex in Huế in which are buried Dục Đức and his wife, his son Thành Thái, and his grandson the child-emperor Duy Tân, and several other members of Vietnam's last dynasty, the Nguyễn dynasty such as the queen mother Nguyễn Thị Định (mother of Duy Tân). 

Duy Tân was buried in the tomb compound in 1987.

The mausoleum has two sections - the tomb itself and Long An shrine.

References 

 
 

Tomb of Duc Duc

Tombs in Vietnam
Buildings and structures in Huế